Johann Carl Rößler (18 May 1775, Görlitz - 20 February 1845, Dresden) was a German portrait painter.

Biography
Originally trained as a nail-maker, he began attending the Dresden Academy of Fine Arts in 1794. His primary instructor there was Giovanni Battista Casanova. His first exhibit came in 1797.

Later, he visited Paris. In 1803, he and a fellow student, Franz Gareis went from Paris to Rome, via Marseille. Gareis died of typhus not long after they arrived. Rößler remained there until 1807, living in an artists' quarter near the Spanish Steps. During his stay, he painted a portrait of the architect, Karl Friedrich Schinkel, and became acquainted with the sculptor, Bertel Thorvaldsen.

In 1810, he became a member of the Dresden Academy, for portrait and history painting. In 1815, he was named a Professor there. From that time on, he was largely devoted to his teaching and his family; doing only some occasional painting.

His notable students included ,  and Adolf Zimmermann.

References

Further reading 
 Georg Kaspar Nagler: Roessler, Johann Carl. In: Neues allgemeines Künstler-Lexicon. Vol.13: Renghiero – Rubens. E. A. Fleischmann, Munich 1843, Online
 Roeßler, Carl. In: Allgemeines Künstlerlexicon. Orell Füssli, Zürich 1850, Online

External links 

 Johann Carl Rössler @ the Thorvaldsen-Museum

1775 births
1845 deaths
19th-century German painters
19th-century German male artists
German portrait painters
Academic staff of the Dresden Academy of Fine Arts
People from Görlitz